Dreambox is a Linux-powered DVB digital satellite and cable decoder set-top box.

Dreambox may also refer to:

"Dreambox", a song by The Frogs from their 1996 album My Daughter the Broad
DreamBox (company), an educational software service provider